Dauphin is a city in Manitoba, Canada, with a population of 8,457 as of the 2016 Canadian Census, with an additional 2,388 living in the surrounding Rural Municipality of Dauphin (RM), for a total of 10,845 in the RM and city combined. The city takes its name from Lake Dauphin and Fort Dauphin (first built 1741), which were named by explorer Pierre Gaultier de La Vérendrye in honour of the Dauphin of France, the heir to the French throne. Dauphin is Manitoba's ninth largest community and serves as a hub to the province's Parkland Region. The current mayor of Dauphin is Christian Laughland. Conservative Dan Mazier has been the member of Parliament for the Dauphin—Swan River—Marquette riding since November 2010. Progressive Conservative Brad Michaleski is the current member of the Legislative Assembly.

Dauphin plays host to several summer festivals, including Dauphin's Countryfest and Canada's National Ukrainian Festival. Dauphin is served by Provincial Trunk Highways 5, 10 and 20 and is surrounded by the Rural Municipality of Dauphin.

Location

Dauphin is in western Manitoba near Duck Mountain Provincial Park and Riding Mountain National Park, just west of Lake Manitoba and Dauphin Lake and south of Lake Winnipegosis.

History
The nearby lake was given the name "Dauphin" by the explorer Pierre Gaultier de Varennes, sieur de La Vérendrye in 1741 in honour of the heir to the French throne. Settlers began arriving in the area in 1883 and two early settlements, Gartmore and "Old Dauphin" were established. With the coming of the railway in 1896 – the line ran roughly halfway between the two villages – settlement shifted to the present site. This coincided with the beginning of Ukrainian settlement in the area: previously most arrivals had been of British extraction.

Dauphin was granted a village charter on 11 July 1898, with George Barker as first mayor. In 1901 Dauphin was incorporated as a town, with George King as mayor. Dauphin became an important centre for the transportation of grain. Farming still plays a central role in the economy of the area, but its role has been greatly reduced.

From 1974 to 1979, a federally funded pilot project called Mincome provided a Basic income guarantee to residents of Dauphin.

Dauphin was incorporated as a city in 1998.

Healthcare

Dauphin is a regional healthcare hub, part of the Prairie Mountain Health authority. The Dauphin General Hospital (now the Dauphin Regional Health Centre) was established in 1901. The Dauphin Medical Clinic provides access to family physicians and specialists, while providing a walk-in clinic and acute care.

Economy

As the largest city within the Parkland, Dauphin has a trading area of over 50,000 people. A large part of Dauphin's economy is based on agriculture, with farms in this area of the province producing grains, oilseeds, honey and livestock. Dauphin is the home to various industries including manufacturing, health care, education, recreation/tourism and retail. The Canadian distribution centre for Norwex is also located in the city.

Education
The first school building was erected in Dauphin in 1903, a frame building on the present Mackenzie School site. The original Whitmore School was built on Fifth Ave. SW in 1907, followed by the Smith-Jackson School on Main Street South in 1922. Today, the Mountain View School Division oversees K-12 education in Dauphin. The City of Dauphin has 7 schools including the Dauphin Regional Comprehensive Secondary School, Mackenzie Middle School, Henderson Elementary School, Lt. Colonel Barker VC School, École Macneill (French Immersion), Whitmore School and Smith-Jackson Ukrainian Bilingual School.
The Assiniboine Community College Parkland Campus, located in Dauphin, provides post-secondary programming in the Parkland. Programs include business, agriculture, applied counseling, nursing and a range of apprenticeship courses.

Transportation

Ground
The city is served by Manitoba Provincial Trunk Highways:
PTH 5
PTH 10
PTH 20
PTH 5A
PTH 10A
PTH 20A

Air
Lt. Col W.G. (Billy) Barker VC Airport serves the area, however no scheduled flights are operated from the airport.

Rail
Dauphin railway station is served by Via Rail's Winnipeg–Churchill train. The rail line is owned by Canadian National (CN) which also operates freight trains through the town.

Sports

Dauphin is a hockey community. The Credit Union Place recreation complex was built in 2006. It is the home of the Dauphin Kings, an MJHL Junior A hockey team, Turnbull Memorial Trophy winners in 1969, 1970, 1972, 1977, 1983, 1993, and 2010 and Anavet Cup winners of 2010. Formerly, the team played in the Dauphin Memorial Community Centre (D.M.C.C.) arena that was built after the Second World War. Dauphin and the Kings hosted the Royal Bank Cup in 2010, the Canadian National Championship for Junior A Hockey. The 1953–54 Dauphin Kings were inducted into the Manitoba Hockey Hall of Fame for winning the team's second Western Canadian Intermediate Championship in a decade and capturing the Edmonton Journal trophy.

Dauphin has a history of title-winning baseball teams. Both the Dauphin Redbirds and later the Dauphin Brewers have claimed numerous provincial titles.

Dauphin high schoolers play a big part of the athletics of Dauphin. They have won many awards and medals in volleyball, track and field, basketball, broomball, curling, football, and hockey.

A Dauphin rink composed of curlers Ab Gowanlock, Jim Williams, Art Pollon and Russ Jackman won the Brier, the Canadian men's curling championship, in 1953.

Dauphin has been called the "horseshoe capital of Canada," in large part due to the efforts of Bert Snart (1912–1988), president of the Dauphin Horseshoe Club for 32 years. In 1976 he was inducted into the Horseshoe Hall of Fame in Levittown, Pennsylvania.

Demographics 

The median household income in 2005 was $35,527, below the Manitoba provincial average of $47,875. According to the 1996 Canadian census, Ukrainians constitute the largest ethnic group in the City of Dauphin, with 41.04% of the population. Almost 26% of the population can speak Ukrainian. 24.17% of the residents have English ancestry, 17.61% Scottish ancestry, and 12.3% Irish ancestry, and approximately 10% are of Aboriginal origin.

Climate
Dauphin has a humid continental climate (Köppen Dfb) with cold winters and warm summers.

Local media
Newspapers
 Dauphin Herald

Radio
 CKDM 730 AM, Country and Adult Contemporary
 CBWW-FM 105.3, CBC Radio One (repeats CBW Winnipeg)
 (Future Station) 106.1, CBC Radio Two

Television

Dauphin was formerly served by a local newscast, which aired on the city's now-defunct retransmitter of CBWT Winnipeg but was produced by Craig Media instead of by CBC Television.

Notable people

 Aimé Adam, politician
 George Balcan, radio broadcaster
 James Ball competed for Canada in the 1928 Summer Olympics held in Amsterdam, Netherlands in the 400 metres, where he won the Silver medal.
 Lt.-Col. William George Barker, VC, Canada's most decorated serviceman, was born in Dauphin in 1894. The Dauphin airport and a school are named after him.
 Frances Bay (1919–2011), attended school in Dauphin. She was a prolific actress in TV and films, with her credits including "Blue Velvet" and "Happy Gilmore."
 James Whitney Bettes, politician
 Angus Bonnycastle, politician
 John C. Bowen, politician
 James Langstaff Bowman (1879–1951), a Dauphin lawyer, was the first Manitoban to be Speaker of the House of Commons.
 Donald Bryk, judge
 Theodore Arthur Burrows (1857–1929), sometime MLA and MP for Dauphin, was Lieutenant-Governor of Manitoba from 1926 until his death.
 Don Caley (1945-2016), hockey goaltender who played one game in the NHL for the St. Louis Blues.
 Jim Cardiff, hockey player
 Robert Cruise, politician
 Connor Dewar, hockey player
 Will Ferguson, writer
 James Galbraith (Canadian politician), politician
 Tammy Gillis, actress
 Erving Goffman (1922–1982), acclaimed sociologist and author of The Presentation of Self in Everyday Life, grew up in Dauphin.
 John Gunne, politician
 Robin Hahn, equestrian
 Christine Harapiak, judge
 Robert Hawkins was Speaker of the Manitoba Legislature from 1937 until 1949.
 Ernest Charles Hoy, born in Dauphin in 1895, was a First World War flying ace who scored 13 victories in just a month and a half in 1918. On 7 August 1919, he flew the first airmail flight over the Canadian Rockies.
 Russ Jackman, curler
 Robert Kabel, hockey player
 Mike Korney, hockey player
 Les Kozak, hockey player
 Brigette Lacquette, hockey player
 Laverne Lewycky, politician
 Laurie MacKenzie, born and resided in Dauphin until age 19, guitarist for The Guess Who.
 Inky Mark, former Mayor of Dauphin, and former member of parliament for the riding of Dauphin—Swan River—Marquette.
 Means (band), musical group
 Ernest McGirr, politician
 Ben Meisner, radio broadcaster
 Barry Merrell, hockey player
 Bif Naked (born Beth Torbert on 15 June 1971), a Juno Award-winning Canadian rock singer-songwriter, poet, cartoonist, and actress attended Dauphin Regional Comprehensive Secondary School in the 1980s.
 John Plohman, politician
 Art Pollon, curler
 Ryan Pulock, NHL defenceman currently with the New York Islanders.
 Gordon Ritchie, politician
 Colby Robak, former NHL player, currently playing with Vaasan Sport in SM-Liiga.
 Fred Sandhu, judge
 Michael Sawchuk, politician
 W. B. Scarth, politician
 Ted Schellenberg, politician
 Panteleymon Shpylka, priest
 Jim Schraefel, hockey player
 John Solomon (Canadian politician), politician
 Barry Trotz, former head coach of the National Hockey League's New York Islanders and 2018 Stanley cup winner, was born and raised in Dauphin.
 William John Ward, politician
 Troy Westwood, longtime CFLer for the Winnipeg Blue Bombers.
 Thomas Wilkinson (bishop of Brandon), bishop
 Jim Williams (curler), curler
 Fred Zaplitny, politician

References

External links

 
1898 establishments in Manitoba
Cities in Manitoba
Populated places established in 1898
Ukrainian-Canadian culture in Manitoba